"Treehouse of Horror IV" is the fifth episode of the fifth season of the American animated television series The Simpsons and the fourth episode in the Treehouse of Horror series of Halloween specials. It originally aired on the Fox network in the United States on October 28, 1993, and features three short stories called "The Devil and Homer Simpson", "Terror at  Feet", and "Bart Simpson's Dracula".

The episode was co-written by Conan O'Brien, Bill Oakley, Josh Weinstein, Greg Daniels, Dan McGrath, and Bill Canterbury, and directed by David Silverman.
As with the rest of the Halloween specials, the episode is considered non-canon and falls outside the show's regular continuity. The episode makes cultural references to television series such as The Twilight Zone, Night Gallery, and Peanuts, as well as films such as The Devil and Daniel Webster, Bram Stoker's Dracula and The Lost Boys. Since airing, the episode has received mostly positive reviews from television critics. It acquired a Nielsen rating of 14.5, and was the highest-rated show on the Fox network the week it aired.

Plot
In a parody of Night Gallery, Bart introduces each of the three segments by walking through a gallery of paintings and each time choosing one of them as the focus of his story.

The Devil and Homer Simpson
In a parody of The Devil and Daniel Webster, at work, Homer states that he would sell his soul for a donut after finding that Lenny and Carl took all the donuts and threw them at an old man (Grampa) "for kicks". The devil, revealed to be Ned Flanders, appears and offers Homer a contract to seal the deal. However, before Homer finishes the donut, he realizes that Ned will not be able to have his soul if he does not eat all of the donut and keeps the final piece in the refrigerator. Unfortunately, while half-asleep and looking for a midnight snack, he eats the final piece of the "forbidden donut", and Ned instantly reappears to take possession of Homer's soul. Marge and Lisa plead with Ned, finally getting him to agree to hold a trial the next day. Until then, Homer is sent to spend the rest of the day being punished in Hell. His first punishment is to be strapped down and force-fed "all the donuts in the world!" (a contrapasso) but he eats them all eagerly. At the stroke of twelve midnight, Ned brings Homer back to the Simpson household for his trial. Then, when the Simpsons' lawyer, Lionel Hutz, flees after ruining his case, Marge makes a final effort to save Homer by displaying a photo from their wedding day. On the back of the photo, Homer has written that, in return for Marge giving him her hand in marriage, he pledges his soul to her forever; therefore, it was not his property to sell at the time of his deal with Ned. The jury rules in favor of the Simpsons and the presiding judge dismisses the case. Defeated and enraged, Ned frees Homer, but gets his revenge by turning Homer's head into a donut. The next morning, Homer cannot stop eating his own head as the police eagerly wait for him (as their breakfast) to leave the house while holding cups of coffee.

Terror at  Feet 
In a parody of The Twilight Zone episode "Nightmare at 20,000 Feet" including the final segment in Twilight Zone: The Movie, after having a nightmare in which he is killed in a bus crash, Bart rides the bus to school one rainy morning, with Principal Skinner as one of the passengers after his mother Agnes confiscates his car keys as punishment for talking to a woman on the phone. Bart panics when he sees a gremlin on the side of the bus loosening the lug nuts on one of the wheels and tries to convince the other passengers of the danger but nobody can see the gremlin (even Kang and Kodos on their spaceship mock Bart for the invisible creature, before discovering an identical gremlin ripping bits and pieces out from their own spaceship). In desperation, Bart climbs halfway out the window to scare off the gremlin with an emergency flare. As Bart is pulled back into the bus by Skinner and Groundskeeper Willie, he drops the flare and by chance, it hits the gremlin, who catches fire and falls from the bus, but is found by Ned, who decides to adopt the creature. When the bus finally stops, everyone sees the obvious damage, but Bart is still sent away to an insane asylum for the rest of his life for his disruptive behavior. Bart is relieved as he is finally able to rest, but the gremlin appears in the back window of the ambulance, holding Ned's decapitated (yet still living) head, which makes Bart scream in terror.

Bart Simpson's Dracula
Before this segment begins, Bart says that the story was supposed to be based on the 1903 painting A Friend in Need from the Dogs Playing Poker series by Cassius Marcellus Coolidge, but it was "far too intense" (Homer has a psychotic episode upon seeing the painting), so they "just threw something together with vampires."

In a parody of Bram Stoker's Dracula, after a news story about several vampire attacks (attributed by the police to a mummy), Lisa begins to suspect that Mr. Burns is a vampire when he is seen on the same report with a drop of blood below his mouth, but the rest of the family dismisses her concerns. The family is invited to Burns' castle in Pennsylvania for a midnight feast, where Bart and Lisa discover a secret staircase descending to an eerie basement filled with coffins. As they investigate, vampires emerge from the coffins and encircle them while Lisa reads through Burns' autobiography "Yes, I Am a Vampire" (with a foreword by Steve Allen). Lisa escapes, but Bart activates the "Super Fun Happy Slide", causing him to slide back down into the vampire pit, whereupon he is captured and bitten by Burns. Lisa tries to warn her parents, but Burns reappears with Bart who is now very pale and is behaving oddly. But these factors get little attention by the family. Later that night, Lisa is awakened by a now undead Bart and his vampire friends outside the bedroom window, in an homage to Salem's Lot. When Bart is about to bite Lisa, Homer and Marge interrupt and discover that Bart is a vampire. Lisa claims that the only way to restore him is to kill the head vampire, Burns. The family returns to Burns' mansion, where Homer drives a stake through Burns' heart (after first hitting his crotch), causing him to dissolve into sand (but he briefly comes back to life to tell Homer "You're fired!"). The next morning, however, Lisa discovers that everyone else in the Simpson family is a vampire, with Marge as their head. The family closes in on Lisa, but instead of attacking, they break character and wish the home audience a happy Halloween. Then, they all harmonize "Hark the Herald Angels Sing", parodying A Charlie Brown Christmas.

Production

"Treehouse of Horror IV" was directed by David Silverman and co-written by Conan O'Brien (his final assignment for The Simpsons; by the time this episode aired, his brand-new late night show on NBC had been on for a little over a month), Bill Oakley, Josh Weinstein, Greg Daniels, Dan McGrath, and Bill Canterbury. It is the fourth episode of the annual Treehouse of Horror Halloween specials. As with the rest of the Halloween specials, the episode is considered non-canon and falls outside the show's regular continuity. O'Brien worked on the "wrap-arounds" of Bart introducing each segment to make sure that they "pulled" the episode together. The wrap-arounds are based on Rod Serling's television series Night Gallery, in which Serling appears at an art gallery and introduces each episode by unveiling paintings depicting the stories. Executive producer James L. Brooks loved the show, so it was "great fun" for him to do the parody. Show runner David Mirkin thought the Treehouse of Horror episodes were the hardest episodes to do because the staff had to fit in all three stories in only 22 minutes. Mirkin said, "Things had to happen really fast. They're really just crammed with jokes and story beats and everything."

The first segment, "The Devil and Homer Simpson", was written by Daniels and McGrath. The first time Devil Flanders appears, he looks the same as the devil Chernabog from the 1940 Walt Disney produced film Fantasia; Silverman particularly admired the animation in that sequence. Oakley loved the idea of Flanders being the Devil because he was the character whom viewers would least expect. He also thought Harry Shearer did a good job of playing Flanders in a much darker way, while remaining very true to the character. Many scenes had to be cut to shorten the segment, including one that showed Homer's severed head being used as a bowling ball by a demon in hell. This scene later appeared in the clip show episode "The Simpsons 138th Episode Spectacular", which aired in the show's seventh season.

The second segment, "Terror at  Feet", was written by Oakley and Weinstein. It was inspired by an episode of The Twilight Zone called "Nightmare at 20,000 Feet", in which William Shatner's character is inside an airplane watching a gremlin tear apart the wing. Silverman watched the episode to get inspiration for Bart's facial expressions. Oakley said there was a lot of work put into the design of the gremlin in "Terror at  Feet" to make him scary "within The Simpsons universe". Mirkin said he felt the gremlin was well-done because he looked scary and "yet it looks like a completely organic Simpsons character". Üter, a character from Germany, makes his first appearance on the show in this segment; he was conceived as a one-time joke, but reappeared in later episodes because Mirkin felt he was "such a perfect stereotype".

The third segment, "Bart Simpson's Dracula", was written by Canterbury. It is based on Francis Ford Coppola's film Bram Stoker's Dracula. Mirkin was a big fan of the film and pushed for a segment about vampires inspired by the movie. He liked the final result and felt Mr. Burns was perfect in the role of Dracula. Dracula and his castle were designed by Silverman. Mirkin, a "big" Peanuts fan, came up with the idea for the ending of "Bart Simpson's Dracula".

Cultural references
The wrap-around segments are a reference to Rod Serling's television series Night Gallery. The paintings seen in these segments are parodies of well-known works, including The Scream, The Son of Man, The Death of Marat, The Persistence of Memory, Three Musicians and Ascending and Descending, all featuring members of the Simpson family.

"Terror at  Feet" is a parody of the final segment seen in Twilight Zone: The Movie and The Twilight Zone episode "Nightmare at 20,000 Feet". The title and a majority of the plot of "Bart Simpson's Dracula" is a parody of the Francis Ford Coppola film Bram Stoker's Dracula. The ending of "Bart Simpson's Dracula" is a reference to A Charlie Brown Christmas.

The demon who is feeding Homer donuts says: "I don't understand it. James Coco went mad in fifteen minutes!", referencing an actor who received attention for his culinary talents and best-selling cookbooks. The jury at Homer's trial consists of John Wilkes Booth, Lizzie Borden, John Dillinger, Blackbeard, Benedict Arnold, the starting lineup of the 1976 Philadelphia Flyers, and Richard Nixon (who points out that he is not yet dead). The first time the Devil appears, he resembles the demon Chernabog from the Walt Disney film Fantasia, especially after Homer discovers a technicality and starts taunting the Devil that he's "smarter than the devil", until the Devil turns into the Chernabog-esque demon and glares at him before disappearing. The scene in Hell where Homer is fed all the doughnuts in the world, and asks for more, is a direct parody of the cartoon Pigs is Pigs, in which the character Piggy (known for being a glutton) is taken in by a scientist and forced to eat all the food in the world. In the school bus, Martin wears a shirt reading Wang Computers. At Mr. Burns' castle, Lisa notices a tome resting on a stand in the basement. She runs over and reads the title: "Yes, I Am a Vampire, by Monty Burns. Foreword by Steve Allen," a reference to American actor Steve Allen. Shortly after she finds the tome, she makes allusions to Shemp and Curly Howard of the Three Stooges, mistaking Bart's fearful attempts at getting her attention as impressions of the two. Bart floating outside Lisa's bedroom window is a parody of The Lost Boys as well as Stephen King's novel Salem's Lot. The family's plan to kill the head vampire is also a reference to both the film and novel. In particular, the twist revelation that Burns is not the head vampire is also a reference to the twist ending of The Lost Boys. The closing credits of the episode features a version of the Simpsons theme that is a combination of the instruments used in The Munsters theme song and the harpsichord and clicking from The Addams Family theme song.

Reception

Critical reception
Since airing, the episode has received mostly positive reviews from television critics. The authors of the book I Can't Believe It's a Bigger and Better Updated Unofficial Simpsons Guide, Warren Martyn and Adrian Wood, said the episode included many notable sequences and was "probably the best" Treehouse of Horror episode. They particularly liked the scenes in Hell where Homer is punished by the Devil, and Chief Wiggum's attempts to deal with Dracula (who he thinks is a mummy) in the "Bart Simpson's Dracula" segment by ordering the Egyptian wing of the Springfield museum to be destroyed. DVD Movie Guide's Colin Jacobson thought "Terror at  Feet" was the best segment of the episode. Jacobson praised "The Devil and Homer Simpson" as clever funny, and described "Bart Simpson's Dracula" as "easily the least effective", claiming it, "presents some good moments but never quite takes flight". Patrick Bromley of DVD Verdict gave the episode an A grade and called it "one of the very best" Halloween specials, although said "Treehouse of Horror V" was better. Central Michigan Lifes John Thorpe named it the tenth best episode of the series, and wrote: "The best part comes when Homer decides not to eat the last part of the doughnut, thus saving him from hell. Hilarious." DVD Talk's Bill Gibron gave the episode a 4 out of 5 score.

Kim Nowacki of Yakima Herald-Republic named "Treehouse of Horror IV" her "all-time favorite" episode. She praised the parodies of The Twilight Zone and A Charlie Brown Christmas. The episode's reference to Bram Stoker's Dracula was named the 32nd greatest film reference in the history of the show by Total Film's Nathan Ditum. James Whitbrook of Gizmodo called "Bart Simpson's Dracula" the "best sketch in what is the best Treehouse of Horror."

Ratings
In its original American broadcast, "Treehouse of Horror IV" finished 17th in the ratings for the week of October 25 to October 31, 1993, with a Nielsen rating of 14.5, translating to 13.6 million households. The episode was the highest-rated show on the Fox network that week.

References

External links

The Simpsons (season 5) episodes
Television episodes about Dracula
Animated television episodes about vampires
Fiction about the Devil
Lawsuits against the Devil
1993 American television episodes
Treehouse of Horror
Parodies of films
Parodies of paintings
Parody television episodes
The Devil and Daniel Webster
Cultural depictions of Benedict Arnold
Cultural depictions of Lizzie Borden
Cultural depictions of Richard Nixon
Cultural depictions of John Wilkes Booth
Cultural depictions of Blackbeard
Cultural depictions of John Dillinger
Philadelphia Flyers
Television episodes about nightmares
Television episodes set in Pennsylvania
Television episodes set in hell
Works set in castles
Halloween television episodes

it:La paura fa novanta I-X#La paura fa novanta IV
fi:Simpsonit (5. tuotantokausi)#Kauhujen talo, osa IV (Treehouse of Horror IV)